Breanna Claire Payton (June 8, 1992December 28, 2018) was an American conservative writer.

Early life and education
Payton was born on June 8, 1992, in San Dimas, California. She graduated from high school at the Western Christian High School. For a time, she worked as a Watchdog.org reporter.  She earned a degree in journalism from Patrick Henry College in 2015.

Career 
Payton worked as a commentator for The Federalist from 2015 to 2018, which labeled her as a "rising star". She was also a conservative commentator on television, appearing on BBC News, Fox News, Fox Business, and the One America News Network.

Death 
Payton died unexpectedly of influenza A virus subtype H1N1 and meningitis on December 28, 2018.

References

1992 births
2018 deaths
Patrick Henry College alumni
American commentators
Deaths from influenza
Deaths from meningitis
Neurological disease deaths in California
Infectious disease deaths in California
American women journalists
21st-century American journalists
21st-century American women writers
People from San Dimas, California